Chacoum Stanie Michaela Koutouan (born 29 October 1990), shortly Michaela Koutouan, is an Ivorian women's football defender. She played in the Turkish Women's First League for Amed S.K.  with jersey number 12. She was a member of the Ivory Coast women's national team.

Playing career

Club
] in the 2018–19 Turkish Women's First Football League. ]]
Koutouan played in her country for Stella Club d'Adjamé. In October 2018, she moved to Turkey and joined the Diyarbakır-based club Amed S.K. to play in the Women's First League.

International
Koutouan was a member of the Ivory Coast women's national team, and took part in one of the three the 2014 African Women's Championship – Group A matches held in Namibia.

Career statistics
.

See also
List of Ivory Coast women's international footballers

References

External links
 CAF player profile

Living people
1990 births
People from Man, Ivory Coast
Ivorian women's footballers
Women's association football defenders
Ivory Coast women's international footballers
Expatriate women's footballers in Turkey
Ivorian expatriate sportspeople in Turkey
Amed S.K. (women) players